Strychy  is a village in the administrative district of Gmina Przytoczna, within Międzyrzecz County, Lubusz Voivodeship, in western Poland.

The village has a population of 185.

References

Strychy